Joy Bright Hancock (4 May 1898 – 20 August 1986), a veteran of both the First and Second World Wars, was one of the first women officers of the United States Navy.

Biography 
Joy Bright was born in Wildwood, New Jersey on 4 May 1898. During World War I, after attending business school in Philadelphia, Pennsylvania, she enlisted in the Navy as a Yeoman (F), serving at Camden, New Jersey and at Naval Air Station Wildwood.

Following the war, she married Lieutenant Charles Gray Little, who was killed in the crash of the airship ZR-2 in 1921. A year later, she obtained employment with the Bureau of Aeronautics, where her duties including editing the Bureau's News Letter, which later evolved into the magazine Naval Aviation News. In 1924, she left the Bureau to marry Lieutenant Commander Lewis Hancock, Jr., who lost his life when airship  crashed in September 1925.

Joy Bright Hancock returned to the Bureau after attending Foreign Service School and obtaining a private pilot's license. For more than a decade before World War II and into the first year of that conflict, she was responsible for the Bureau's public affairs activities.

On 15 October 1942, she was commissioned as a lieutenant in the newly formed Women's Reserve, commonly known as Women Accepted for Volunteer Emergency Service (WAVES). She initially served as WAVES representative in the Bureau of Aeronautics and later in a similar position for the Deputy Chief of Naval Operations (Air). She was promoted to lieutenant commander on 26 November 1943 and to the rank of commander by the end of the War.

In February 1946, Commander Hancock became the Assistant Director (Plans) of the Women's Reserve and was promoted to WAVES' Director in July of that year.   She was promoted to the rank of captain on 15 October 1948.  Her promotion to captain after only 6 years of service was one of fastest progressions to that rank in the Navy's history.

She guided the WAVES through the difficult years of Naval contraction in the later 1940s and the expansion of the early 1950s, a period that also saw the Navy's women achieve status as part of the Regular Navy. Captain Hancock retired from active duty in June 1953.

The next year, she married Vice Admiral Ralph A. Ofstie and accompanied him on his 1955–56 tour as Commander, Sixth Fleet. Following her husband's death in late 1956, she lived in the Washington, D.C., area and in the Virgin Islands.

Hancock published her autobiography, Lady in the Navy: A Personal Reminiscence, in 1972.

She died on 20 August 1986, aged 88, in Bethesda, Maryland. She was buried with her husband, Admiral Ofstie, at Arlington National Cemetery.

Awards 

Legion of Merit
Navy Commendation Medal
World War I Victory Medal
American Campaign Medal
World War II Victory Medal
National Defense Service Medal

See also 
 Women in the United States Navy
 WAVES
 Yeoman (F)

References

Further reading
 Alsmeyer, Marie Bennett. The Way of the WAVES: Women in the Navy (Hamba Books, 1981).
 Campbell, D'Ann. "Women in the American Military." in James C. Bradford, ed., A Companion to American Military History (2010): 869+. 
 Daugherty, Leo J.  "Hancock, Joy Bright" American National Biography (1999) online
 Godson, Susan H. Serving proudly: A history of women in the US Navy (Naval Institute Press, 2001).
 Hall, Mary-Beth. Crossed Currents: Navy Women in a Century of Change (Potomac Books, 2014).
 Hancock, Joy Bright. Lady in the Navy: A Personal Reminiscence (1972).

External links 

 Capt. Joy Hancock at Naval Historical Center, includes photo gallery
 Joy Bright Hancock Organization website
 Joy Bright Hancock Leadership Award
 Arlington National Cemetery biography

1898 births
1986 deaths
People from Wildwood, New Jersey
Female United States Navy officers
WAVES personnel
Burials at Arlington National Cemetery
People from Bethesda, Maryland
United States Navy captains
Yeoman (F) personnel